Metro F.C. is a New Zealand association football club, based in Auckland, that competes in the NRFL Championship, after winning promotion from Lotto Sport Italia NRFL Division 2 during the 2019 season.

The club was known as Metro College until the 1980s. They were members of the former top premier New Zealand football league the New Zealand National Soccer League which ended in 2004 to give way to the New Zealand Football Championship. The senior team is led by Nathan Christie;– an experienced coach both as a head coach and assistant coach, Nathan Christie took over in the 2018 season after the club was relegated to Lotto Sport Italia NRFL Division 2 after the 2017 season. The club has a good history of playing at one of the two top level football leagues in New Zealand after the New Zealand Football Championship, they have also won one of the top leagues in New Zealand football the Northern League in the 1998 season and also managing to set a record of scoring the most goals in any match of the top New Zealand football national cup the Chatham Cup demolishing Norwest 21–0.

History
Metro was formed in 1899 as the Tabernacle-Metropolitan Club by parishioners of the local Baptist Church, and claims to Auckland's second-oldest existing club after North Shore United (which was founded in 1898).  The club shortened its name to Metropolitan in 1921. Following amalgamation with College United in 1929 it changed its name to Metro College; the name was finally shortened to Metro in 1986.

The club's home ground is Phyllis Street Reserve in Mount Albert, Auckland, where it has been based since 1950.

Metro jointly hold the record for the largest ever victory in any stage of the Chatham Cup. In 1991, they demolished Norwest 21–0, a record since equalled in 2005 by Central United (coincidentally also against Norwest). Metro have twice reached the semi-finals of the cup, in 1946 and 1998, but have yet to play in a final.

Youth team & Academy
Metro F.C. are known for their strong youth teams and organised academy system;   The club's U-19 team had seen them reaching the Finals of the 2009 Auckland Football Federation U-19 tournament qualifications only to lose 2–1 to Mangere United U-19 team for a place at the top football national youth tournament in New Zealand the 2009 Napier National U-19 Championships where they had secured 2nd place and had qualified for the tournament then later going on to reach the semi-finals of the 2009 Napier National U-19 Championship Satellite(2nd tier).

Honours

References

External links
Official website
Auckland Football Federation
The Ultimate New Zealand Soccer Website

Association football clubs in Auckland
Association football clubs established in 1899
1899 establishments in New Zealand